Johann Ignaz Walter (31 August 1755 – 22 February 1822) was an operatic tenor, opera director and composer in Austria and Germany.

Life
Walter was born in 1755 Radonice (now in the Czech Republic). He trained in singing when he was young, then from 1773 studied composition in Vienna with Josef Starzer. His first stage appearance is thought to be in Vienna. During the 1780s he appeared as principal tenor in Prague, then in Riga. In 1786 he married Julia Roberts, an opera singer, and they afterwards appeared together, including in Mainz at the court theatre  of the Elector.

In 1793 he joined the opera company of Gustav Friedrich Wilhelm Großmann, with whom he appeared in Kassel, Pyrmont, Bremen, Hanover and other cities. From 1795 he was entrusted as artistic director, and he took over the management of the company after Großmann's death in 1796; the company subsequently performed in Bremen, Hanover and elsewhere.

From 1804 Walter was theatre director in Regensburg. He died there in 1822.

Works
Walter composed several operas, operettas and Singspiele, and other vocal works, including the opera Doctor Faust (1797).

References

External links
 

1755 births
1822 deaths
18th-century composers
19th-century composers
18th-century Austrian male opera singers
19th-century Austrian male opera singers
Austrian operatic tenors
Austrian opera composers
Austrian opera directors